Aodh Buí Mac Cruitín (1680–1755) was an Irish poet, tutor, and soldier,

Biography

Mac Cruitín was a descendant of a bardic family of Thomond. Other members of his family included the musician, Gilla Duibin Mac Cruitín (died 1405), and the poets Aindrias Mac Cruitín (c.1650-c.1738) and Seamus Mac Cruitín (1815–1870). He lived about ten years in Dublin where he worked with Jonathan Swift on Irish sources for a history of Ireland and another ten years on the Continent, mostly at Louvain and Paris. While in Flanders he published an Irish grammar and joined Lord Clare's regiment of the Irish Brigade for a short time. In Paris he published an English-Irish dictionary in 1732 which included a poem by him which is the only example of a poem published in Irish in the Eighteenth-century. He returned to Ireland in 1738 where he taught in Limerick and then his native Clare.

Works
Mac Cruitín is the author of A Brief Discourse in Vindication of the Antiquity of Ireland which tracks both real and imagined events in Irish history from the steppes of Scythia to the Norman Invasion.

See also

 Piaras Feiritéar
 Dáibhí Ó Bruadair
 Cathal Buí Mac Giolla Ghunna
 Aogán Ó Rathaille
 Séamas Dall Mac Cuarta
 Art Mac Cumhaigh
 Seán Clárach Mac Dónaill
 Eoghan Rua Ó Súilleabháin

References
 Ireland and the Jacobite Cause, 1685-1766: A Fatal Attachment, p. 137, 151, 152, 154, 162, 163, 250, 260, 261, Éamonn Ó Ciardha, Four Courts Press, 2001, 2004.

External links
 http://www.clarelibrary.ie/eolas/coclare/literature/bardic/aodh_mac_cruitin.htm
 http://www.clarelibrary.ie/eolas/coclare/literature/ar_phosadh.htm
 https://books.google.com/books?id=vDsAaXKLGvYC&pg=PA331 
 http://www.ricorso.net/rx/az-data/authors/Mac/M-Cruitin_AB/life.htm

1680 births
1775 deaths
Irish poets
Irish soldiers
Irish Jacobites
Irish-language poets
Writers from County Clare
18th-century Irish people